The boys tournament in volleyball at the 2019 European Youth Summer Olympic Festival was held from 22 to 27 July at the Darnagul Arena and the MES Sport and Health Center in Baku, Azerbaijan.

Competition schedule

Participating teams

 (host)

Pool composition

Preliminary round

Group A

|}

|}

Group B

|}

|}

Final round

Classification bracket

Classification 5–8

|}

Seventh place game

|}

Fifth place game

|}

Championship bracket

Semifinals

|}

Third place game

|}

Final

|}

Final standings

References

External links

Volleyball at the 2019 European Youth Summer Olympic Festival